Chebeinan Station, literally Chebei South Station and formerly Huangzhou Station when planning, is an interchange station of Guangzhou Metro Line 4 and Line 5. It is located at the underground of the junction of Chebei Road and Huangpu Avenue East in Tianhe District. It opened on 28 December 2009. A public toilet was built outside the station for the convenience of passengers.

Station layout

Exits

References

Railway stations in China opened in 2009
Guangzhou Metro stations in Tianhe District